Craig Price (born 22 June 1989) is a Welsh rugby union player. A flanker, he plays club rugby for Neath RFC having previously played for Scarlets, Tonmawr RFC and Llanelli RFC.

He was selected in the Wales Sevens squad for 2012-13 and has played in 19 tournaments.

References

External links
 Scarlets profile

Welsh rugby union players
Scarlets players
1989 births
Living people
Rugby union players from Neath
Rugby sevens players at the 2014 Commonwealth Games
Commonwealth Games rugby sevens players of Wales